= Huang Xu (businessman) =

Chinese businessman

- Born: Huang Xu; 1967 or 1968 (age 58–59)
- Known for: Founder and chairman of Fuzhou Fuzhou Rockchip Electronics

Huang Xu (born 1967/1968) is a Chinese businessman and billionaire who founded the semiconductor manufacturer Fuzhou Rockchip Electronics. He lives in Fuzhou, China.

Forbes lists his net worth as of April 2022 at US$1.1 billion.
